La Bibbia Giorno e Notte (The Bible Day and Night) was an Italian television broadcast starting on 5 October 2008 in which the full text of The Bible was read and transmitted by RAI TV non-stop for nearly six days (139 hours). The reading was opened by Pope Benedict at 19:10, who read the first chapter of Genesis, followed by a cast of 1452 readers, including Hebraic and Islamic representatives. Readers ranged from a simple Italian family, a child, and a blind man, to ex-presidents of the Italian Republic, the Italian ex-prime minister Giulio Andreotti, and show-business celebrities such as Roberto Benigni. The reading was closed by Card. Tarcisio Bertone.

Details 
The event took place in Basilica di Santa Croce in Gerusalemme in Rome. The first and the last hour (13:17:11 October 2008) was transmitted by Rai Uno and Eurovision. The full transmission was seen via satellite on Rai Edu2 Channel (SKY chan 806) or online.

The broadcast received a special prize at the 2009 Premio Regia Televisiva awards.

References

External links 
Official web site
Full list of readers

Catholic Church in Italy
Italian television shows